These are the results of the boys' singles badminton event at the 2010 Summer Youth Olympics. The 32 qualified athletes were split into 8 groups, with four players each. In their groups, they play a one-way round-robin and the first of each group qualifies to the quarterfinals, where they play a knock-out stage until the medal matches.

Badminton was staged at the Singapore Indoor Stadium.

Group play

Groups

Results

Group A

Group B

Group C

Group D

Group E

Group F

Group G

Group H

Knockout stage

References
Schedule

Badminton at the 2010 Summer Youth Olympics